Pec pod Sněžkou is a town in Trutnov District in the Hradec Králové Region of the Czech Republic. It has about 600 inhabitants. The village lies at the base of the highest Czech mountain, Sněžka, in the Giant Mountains. From the town a two-section cable car system leads to the top of Sněžka. The ski resort at Pec pod Sněžkou is one of the best-known mountain resorts in the country.

Administrative parts

The village of Velká Úpa is an administrative part of Pec pod Sněžkou.

Geography
It lies in the Giant Mountains and, with the exception of the built-up area, in the Krkonoše National Park.

The Úpa River springs here and flows across the municipality, the Zelený Stream flows into it in the centre of Pec pod Sněžkou. The built-up area is located in the valley of these two watercourses.

History

The oldest documented settlement in the area is the mining village Obří důl (meaning "Giant Mine"), where the first recorded mining occurred in 1511. Mainly copper ore and arsenopyrite were mined until 1959, when the mines were closed after nearly 450 years.

The village Pec pod Sněžkou was founded in the 16th century, when it was one of three parts of Velká Úpa. This was the result of extensive logging and felling of forests in the area. The area was colonized by lumberjacks from Styria, Carinthia and Tyrol, who built huts, founded meadows in forest clearings, and bred cattle and goats.

Demographics

Transport
Pec pod Sněžkou has direct bus connection with Prague.

An old chairlift from 1949 to the top of Sněžka was replaced by a new cable car system in February 2014. The system consists of two sections and can carry up to 250 visitors per hour in four-person cabins.

Sport

The ski resort is one of the best-known and most frequented mountain resorts in the Czech Republic. Pec pod Sněžkou provides a modern chairlift, 10 surface ski lifts with a transport capacity of 9,620 persons per hour, a jagged freestyle park, the longest and best-lit slope for evening skiing, a 900-metre-long bobsleigh track, a snow tubing ice channel, and a number of cross-country skiing routes. It is now included in SkiResort Černá hora – Pec, which forms the largest Czech ski resort.

Sights
The Na Peci Tavern is a cultural monument. The house was built in 1793 and is an example of vernacular architecture.

The Chapel of the Virgin Mary was built in 1888 and renovated in 1933.

Notable people
Rudolf Franz Lehnert (1878–1948), Austrian photographer
Gustl Berauer (1912–1986), German nordic combined skier
Miloslav Sochor (born 1952), alpine skier

Twin towns – sister cities

Pec pod Sněžkou is twinned with:
 Karpacz, Poland

See also
Špindlerův Mlýn, the largest mountain resort

References

External links

Webcam
History and etymology of town name

Cities and towns in the Czech Republic
Ski areas and resorts in the Czech Republic
Populated places in Trutnov District